Moscow Scientific-Research Television Institute (MNITI) is a leading institute in Russia that deals with research and development of broadcasting technologies. The institute was developed following a resolution by the Russian government on March 4, 1950.

External links
Official site

Science and technology in Russia
Universities and institutes established in the Soviet Union
1950 establishments in the Soviet Union
Television in Russia
Mass media in Moscow
Research institutes in the Soviet Union
Television in the Soviet Union